MV Monte Palomares was a Spanish cargo ship that operated from 1961 until her sinking in 1966 with the loss of 32 of her 38 crew.

She was built by Euskalduna in Olaveaga, Bilbao, Spain. She was launched on 28 July 1961, and delivered to her owners in November. At the time of her loss, she was owned by Naviera Aznar and her captain was José Goitia.

She issued a distress call midday on 10 January, and sank sometime later that day. In response to the call, the American cargo ship Steel Maker and the Danish cargo ship Thuro Maersk sailed for Monte Palomares, and the United States Coast Guard dispatched an aircraft from Newfoundland to search the area, as well as the cutter USCGC Barataria from Bermuda and the cutter USCGC Escanaba from her patrol in the area. In the early morning of 11 January, Steel Maker rescued four crewmembers from Monte Palomares, who had abandoned their ship in a life raft. Later in the day, Escanaba recovered a second life raft containing two survivors and the body of a Monte Palomares crewmember. On 14 January, the Coast Guard ended the search for further survivors.

References

1961 ships
Maritime incidents in 1966
Ships built in Spain
Merchant ships of Spain